Katy Spychakov (born 6 August 1999) is an Israeli windsurfer. Spychakov won the 2015 Female Under 17 Techno 293 World Championships, the 2016 RS:X Class Youth Female World Championships, and the 2019 U21 Women's RS:X World Championships. She won a silver medal in the Women's 2019 RS:X World Championships.

Early life
Spychakov was born in Eilat, Israel, to immigrant parents from Ukraine. She has three siblings. She served as a soldier in the Israeli Navy at the Atlit naval base.

She began windsurfing when she was 10 years old, and racing when she was 13 years old. Spychakov is a member of the Hapoel Eilat Sailing Club.

Career
Spychakov won the silver medal in the 2013 Female Under 15 Techno 293 World Championships, the silver medal in the 2014 Female Under 17 Techno 293 World Championships, and the gold medal in the 2015 Female Under 17 Techno 293 World Championships.

She won the 2016 RS:X Class Youth Female World Championships in Limassol, Cyprus.

In August 2019 Spychakov won a bronze medal in the RS:X Women’s competition at Ready Steady Tokyo – Sailing on the island of Enoshima, Japan.

In September 2019 she won a silver medal in the Women's 2019 RS:X World Championships, and was an U21 winner in the Women's 2019 RS:X World Championships at Lake Garda in Italy. It was Israel's  first world championship medal since windsurfer Maayan Davidovich's bronze medal at the RS:X World Championships in 2014.

She competed in the 2020 Summer Olympics in the Women's RS:X event.

References

External links
 
 
 
 
 
 

1999 births
Living people
Israeli female sailors (sport)
Olympic sailors of Israel
Sailors at the 2020 Summer Olympics – RS:X
Israeli windsurfers
Female windsurfers
Israeli Navy personnel
Israeli people of Ukrainian descent
Israeli people of Soviet descent
People from Eilat